My Little Pony: Equestria Girls – Rollercoaster of Friendship is a 2018 Flash animated one-hour television special based on Hasbro's My Little Pony: Equestria Girls toyline and media franchise, which is a spin-off of the 2010 relaunch of Hasbro's My Little Pony toyline. Written and edited by Nick Confalone and directed by Ishi Rudell and Katrina Hadley, it is the second one-hour Equestria Girls special, following Forgotten Friendship (2018), and preceding Spring Breakdown (2019), Sunset's Backstage Pass (2019), and Holidays Unwrapped (2019).

The special aired on Discovery Family on July 6, 2018.

Synopsis
Rarity takes a summer job as a costume designer for a new amusement park. Meanwhile, the chief costume designer, Vignette Valencia, is once seen trying to have a salad, and when she tries to post a picture on social media, her phone sucks the salad into it. Vignette wonders how it is possible, and likes the new feature. Rarity meets Vignette and designs costumes for a special parade at the amusement park. On the day of the parade, she invites her friends, Applejack, Rainbow Dash, Pinkie Pie, Fluttershy, Sunset Shimmer and Twilight Sparkle. Vignette then decides to put up the Rainbooms on the parade.

When Fluttershy meets with Vignette, Vignette puts up her suggestion on Fluttershy's look for the parade. But Fluttershy disapproves of it and is zapped into the phone unexpectedly by Vignette. Applejack looks for Fluttershy, but cannot find her. Soon, Vignette puts up her suggestion on Rainbow Dash's parade look, but she disapproves it and is also zapped up into the phone. The two end up in a white place with the salad that Vignette zapped up in the beginning. Applejack then sees footage that exposes Vignette's true colours to her. She now looks for Rarity to warn her about Vignette but she does not believe her, which turns into a confrontation after Vignette denies any sort of such zapping, upsetting them both. In the mean time, she zaps up Pinkie Pie, Sunset and Twilight when they disapprove of some over-the-top looks. They are all locked in the white place and meet Rainbow Dash and Fluttershy, sharing each other's stories and trying to get out. Vignette prepares for the parade by projecting fake versions of the Rainbooms and designing them the way she wants. She then reveals her plan to Rarity and tries to zap her, but got away

Rarity finds Applejack and tells her that they cannot let Vignette perform at the cost of losing their friends. Rarity understands this and helps Applejack solve the problem. They phone call their friends, and when Applejack opens a door, she sees the white room where her friends were trapped and reconciles with them. They then plot to stop Vignette's parade. They come on the stage and warn Vignette, but she does not care about them. All the Rainbooms use Equestrian Magic and release a Rainbow Laser to free Vignette's phone from the Zapping Magic. Vignette feels devastated, and tells that she did this because she had the philosophy of "BYBB" (Be Yourself But Better). Rarity then explains that we must not be better at the cost of harming our friends. Vignette then reveals that despite having so many fans, she does not have any friends. Rarity and Applejack offer friendship, and things end on a happy note with the Rainbooms performing the song "Side by Side" at the parade, led by Rarity and Applejack, and having loads of fun at the amusement park.

Cast 
 Tabitha St. Germain — Rarity 
 Ashleigh Ball — Applejack / Rainbow Dash
 Rebecca Shoichet — Sunset Shimmer / Costume Designer in a special appearance in the song "Side by Side"
 Tara Strong — Twilight Sparkle
 Andrea Libman — Pinkie Pie / Fluttershy
 Tegan Moss — Vignette Valencia
 James Kirk — Micro Chips
 Sam Vincent — Flim
 Scott McNeil — Flam
 Richard Newman — Security Guard

Featured Singers
 Kazumi Evans - Rarity
 Rebecca Shoichet - Twilight Sparkle

Release 
Rollercoaster of Friendship premiered on Discovery Family as part of its "Summer Surprises" programming block on July 6, 2018. Much like its predecessor Forgotten Friendship, the special was edited down into a 50-minute original cut of five episodes on Hasbro's YouTube channel. Its first episode was uploaded on August 31, 2018 and its last episode on September 28.

Episodes

Home media and streaming 

On October 1, 2018, the special was made available for streaming on Netflix in the United States alongside Forgotten Friendship.

Bundled with Forgotten Friendship, the special was also released on DVD on November 1, 2018 in the United Kingdom.

References

External links 
 

My Little Pony: Friendship Is Magic
2018 television specials
2010s animated television specials
Films set in amusement parks
Equestria Girls films